is a 1997 Japanese film directed by Shūsuke Kaneko. The film is about elementary school children who are taken to an alternate universe through a school mirror.

The film was one of the higher grossing Japanese films in 1997, grossing as much Rebirth of Mothra and Neon Genesis Evangelion: Death & Rebirth. The film won Naomi Nishida the award for Best Newcomer at the 21st Japan Academy Prize.

Cast
 Naomi Nishida as Kaoru Yahashi
 Hitomi Kuroki as Machiko Kubota
 Hideki Noda as a school teacher
 Takuma Yoshizawa as Ryo Kubota
 Aki Maeda as Mayuko Fujii
 Takeru Higa as Taichi
 Kazuki Yamada as Makoto Ota
 Hironobu Nomura as Teacher Tameyama
 Masahiko Tsugawa as the school master
 Machiko Watanabe as Makoto's mother
 Kei Satō as Takuya

Release
School Ghost Stories 3 was released in Japan on July 19, 1997 where it was distributed by Toho. The film grossed a total of 1.150 billion yen on its theatrical release in Japan.

Reception
Naomi Nishida won the Award for Best Newcomer at the 21st Japan Academy Prize.

References

Bibliography

External links
 
 Review at Sarudama

1997 films
Films based on Japanese novels
Films directed by Shusuke Kaneko
Gakkō no Kaidan
1990s ghost films
Toho films
Japanese ghost films
1990s Japanese films

ja:学校の怪談 (映画)#『学校の怪談3』（1997年）
zh:學校怪談 (電影)#1997年電影版